This is a list of notable individuals and organizations who endorsed Leni Robredo, her running mate Francis Pangilinan, or both of them in their campaign to be elected President and Vice President of the Philippines, respectively, in the 2022 election.

Political endorsements

Presidents 

 Fidel V. Ramos, 12th President of the Philippines (1992–1998)

Cabinet-level officials 

 Julia Abad, Director-General of the Presidential Management Staff (2010–2016)
 Florencio Abad, Secretary of Budget and Management (2010–2016), Secretary of Education (2004–2005), Secretary of Agrarian Reform (1989–1990), Batanes representative (1987–1989, 1995–2004)
 Jun Abaya, Secretary of Transportation and Communications (2012–2016), Cavite's 1st district representative (2004–2012), great-grandson of President Emilio Aguinaldo
 Nereus Acosta, Presidential Adviser for Environmental Protection (2011–2016), General Manager of the Laguna Lake Development Authority (2011–2016), Bukidnon's 1st district representative (1998–2007), Bukidnon Provincial Board member (1995–1998)
 Silvestre Afable, Jr., Press Secretary (2002)
 Estrella F. Alabastro, Secretary of Science and Technology (2001–2010)
 Delia Albert, Secretary of Foreign Affairs (2003–2004), Philippine Ambassador to Australia (1995–2002), Philippine Ambassador to Germany (2005–2010)
 Angel Alcala, Secretary of Environment and Natural Resources (1992–1995), Chairperson of the Commission on Higher Education (1995–1999), National Scientist of the Philippines
 Proceso Alcala, Secretary of Agriculture (2010–2016), Quezon's 2nd district representative (2004–2010)
 Jose Rene Almendras, Secretary of Energy (2010–2012), Cabinet Secretary (2012–2016), Acting Secretary of Foreign Affairs (2016)
 Rolando Andaya Jr., Secretary of Budget and Management (2006–2010), Camarines Sur's 1st district representative (1998–2006, 2010–2019), House Deputy Speaker (2016–2018), House Majority Leader (2018–2019)
 Luwalhati Antonino, Chairperson of the Mindanao Development Authority (2010–2016), South Cotabato's 1st district representative (1992–2001), co-founder of the Achievers with Integrity Movement
 Senen C. Bacani, Secretary of Agriculture (1990–1992)
 Rosalinda Baldoz, Secretary of Labor and Employment (2010–2016), Administrator of the Philippine Overseas Employment Administration (2001–2010)
 Alfredo Bengzon, Secretary of Health (1986–1992)
 Jose S. Brillantes, Secretary of Labor and Employment (1995–1996)
 Ignacio Bunye, Press Secretary (2002–2003, 2004–2008), Chairperson of the Metropolitan Manila Development Authority (1991–1992), Muntinlupa representative (1998–2001), Mayor of Muntinlupa, Metro Manila (1986–1987, 1988)
 Esperanza Cabral, Secretary of Health (2009–2010), Secretary of Social Welfare and Development (2005–2009)
 Dante Canlas, Director-General of the National Economic and Development Authority (1998–2001), economist
 Emmanuel Caparas, Secretary of Justice (2016)
 Ricky Carandang, Secretary of the Presidential Communications Development and Strategic Planning Office (2010–2013), former broadcast journalist
 Cesar Sarino, Secretary of Interior and Local Government (1991–1992)
 Nieves Confesor, Secretary of Labor and Employment (1992–1995)
 Adrian Cristobal Jr, Secretary of Trade and Industry (2015–2016)
 Avelino J. Cruz Jr., Secretary of National Defense (2004–2006), former president of the Philippine Bar Association
 Gemma Cruz-Araneta, Secretary of Tourism (1998–2001), beauty queen (Miss International 1964 winner), writer
 Manuel Dayrit, Secretary of Health (2001–2005)
 Teresita Quintos Deles, Presidential Adviser on the Peace Process (2003–2005, 2010–2016)
 Edilberto de Jesus, Secretary of Education (2002–2004)
 Edicio dela Torre, Director-General of the Technical Education and Skills Development Authority (1998–2001), activist, educator
 Benjamin de Leon, Presidential Assistant (1992–1998)
 Virgilio de los Reyes, Secretary of Agrarian Reform (2010–2016)
 Albert del Rosario, Secretary of Foreign Affairs (2011–2016), Philippine Ambassador to the United States (2001–2006)
 Ramon Del Rosario Jr., Secretary of Finance ad interim (1992–1993)
 Gregory Domingo, Secretary of Trade and Industry (2010–2015)
 Emmanuel Esguerra, Director-General of the National Economic and Development Authority (2016)
 Jaime Galvez Tan, Secretary of Health (1995)
 Cesar Garcia, National Security Adviser (2010–2016), former director-general of the National Intelligence Coordinating Agency
 Ester Garcia, former chairperson of the Commission on Higher Education
 Voltaire Gazmin, Secretary of National Defense (2010–2016), Philippine Ambassador to Cambodia (2002–2004), Commanding General of the Philippine Army (1999–2000), Commander of the Presidential Security Group (1986–1992)
 Ernesto Garilao, Secretary of Agrarian Reform (1992–1998)
 Barry Gutierrez, Spokesperson of the Office of the Vice President of the Philippines (2016–present), Akbayan party-list representative (2013–2016), spokesperson for the Leni Robredo 2022 presidential campaign
 Cielito Habito, Director-General of the National Economic and Development Authority (1992–1998), economist
 Fe A. Hidalgo, Secretary of Education officer-in-charge (2005–2006)
 Florin Hilbay, Solicitor General of the Philippines (2014–2016)
 Lina Laigo, Secretary of Social Welfare and Development (1995–1998)
 Jesli Lapus, Secretary of Trade and Industry (2010), Secretary of Education (2006–2010), Tarlac's 3rd district representative (1998–2006), uncle of President Benigno Aquino III
 Delfin Lazaro, Secretary of Energy (1993–1994)
 Edwin Lacierda, Presiential Spokesperson (2010–2016)
 Patricia Licuanan, Chairperson of the Commission on Higher Education (2010–2018), Chairperson of the National Commission on the Role of Filipino Women
 Alberto Lim, Secretary of Tourism (2010–2011)
 Narzalina Lim, Secretary of Tourism (1992)
 Armin Luistro, Secretary of Education (2010–2016), president of De La Salle University (2006–2010), member of the De La Salle Brothers
 Rafael V. Mariano, Secretary of Agrarian Reform ad interim (2016–2017), Anakpawis party-list representative (2004–2013)
 Liza Maza, Lead Convenor of the National Anti-Poverty Commission (2016–2018), Bayan Muna party-list representative (2001–2004), Gabriela party-list representative (2004–2010)
 Christian Monsod, Chairperson of the Commission on Elections (1991–1995), member of the Philippine Constitutional Commission of 1986, secretary-general of the National Citizens' Movement for Free Elections during the 1986 presidential election, lawyer
 Solita Monsod, Director-General of the National Economic and Development Authority (1986–1989), economist
 Mario Montejo, Secretary of Science and Technology (2010–2016)
 Edmundo Mir, Secretary of Public Works and Highways (1993)
 Imelda M. Nicolas, Chairperson of the Commission on Filipinos Overseas (2010–2016), Secretary-General of the National Anti-Poverty Commission (2004–2005), Chairperson of the National Commission on the Role of Filipino Women (1993–1998)
 Thomas Orbos, Chairperson of the Metropolitan Manila Development Authority officer-in-charge (2016–2017), General Manager of the Metropolitan Manila Development Authority (2016–2018), Assistant General Manager for Planning of the Metropolitan Manila Development Authority (2014–2016) (previously endorsed Isko Moreno)
 Ramón Paje, Secretary of Environment and Natural Resources (2010–2016)
 Ernesto Pernia, Director-General of the National Economic and Development Authority (2016–2020), economist
 Manolo Quezon, Undersecretary of the Presidential Communications Development and Strategic Planning Office (2014–2016), grandson of President Manuel L. Quezon
 Victor Ramos, Secretary of Environment and Natural Resources (1995–1998)
 Joel Rocamora, Lead Convenor of the National Anti-Poverty Commission (2010–2016), political analyst, civil society leader
 Carmencita Reodica, Secretary of Health (1996–1998)
 Roberto Romulo, Secretary of Foreign Affairs (1992–1995) (deceased)
 Etta Rosales, Chairperson of the Commission on Human Rights (2010–2015), Akbayan party-list representative (1998–2007), activist
 Mar Roxas, Secretary of the Interior and Local Government (2012–2015), Secretary of Transportation and Communications (2011–2012), Secretary of Trade and Industry (2000–2003), 2010 vice presidential candidate under the Liberal Party, Senator of the Philippines (2004–2010), Capiz's 1st district representative (1993–2000), grandson of President Manuel Roxas, Leni Robredo's running mate in 2016
 Mel Senen Sarmiento, Secretary of the Interior and Local Government (2015–2016), Samar's 1st district representative (2010–2015), Mayor of Calbayog, Samar (2001–2010), Vice Mayor of Calbayog (1992–1995)
 Rogelio Singson, Secretary of Public Works and Highways (2010–2016)
 Ismael Sueno, Secretary of the Interior and Local Government (2016–2017), Governor of South Cotabato (1986–1992), Mayor of Koronadal, South Cotabato (1980–1986), Chairman of PDP–Laban (2014–2016), 1998 vice presidential candidate
 Judy Taguiwalo, Secretary of Social Welfare and Development ad interim (2016–2017)
 Paulyn Ubial, Secretary of Health ad interim (2016–2017)
 Mona D. Valisno, Secretary of Education (2010)
 Abigail Valte, Deputy Presidential Spokesperson (2010–2016)

National-level executive officials and civil servants 

 Peter Abaya, CEO and General Manager of the Philippine Reclamation Authority (2010–2016) and great-grandson of President Emilio Aguinaldo
 Tomas Africa, former National Statistics Office administrator
 Zorayda Amelia Alonzo, President of the Home Development Mutual Fund (1989–1999)
 Victoria Avena, Commissioner of the Presidential Commission on Good Government (2001–2004)
 Rene G. Bañez, Commissioner of the Bureau of Internal Revenue (2001–2002)
 Ma. Regina Bautista-Martin, Administrator of the Sugar Regulatory Administration (2010–2016)
 Yasmin Busran–Lao, former chairperson of the National Commission of Muslim Filipinos
 Orlan Calayag, Administrator of the National Food Authority (2013–2014), Mayor of Dolores, Quezon (2019–present)
 Ruben Carranza, Commissioner of the Presidential Commission on Good Government (2001–2004), human rights lawyer
 Melchor V. Cayabyab, former chairperson of the Cooperative Development Authority
 Honorito Chaneco, former administrator of the Light Rail Transit Authority
 Jose L. Cuisia Jr., 7th Governor of the Bangko Sentral ng Pilipinas (1990–1993), Philippine Ambassador to the United States (2011–2016)
 Rolando S. Dela Goza, former Commission on Higher Education commissioner, president of Adamson University (1985–1994)
 Lilia de Lima, Director-General of the Philippine Economic Zone Authority (1995–2016), delegate to the Philippine Constitutional Convention of 1971
 Antonio A. Fleta, former agriculture undersecretary
 Euclides Forbes, Administrator of the Philippine Coconut Authority (2011–2014)
 Rowena Guanzon, Commissioner of the Commission on Elections (2015–2022), Commissioner of the Commission on Audit (2013–2015), Mayor of Cadiz, Negros Occidental (1986–1992), lawyer
 Milwida Guevara, former finance undersecretary
 Diwa C. Guinigundo, Deputy Governor of the Bangko Sentral ng Pilipinas (2005–2019), economist
 Reynaldo A. Laguda, Undersecretary for Education (2015–2016)
 Mario Lamberte, former president of the Philippine Institute for Development Studies, economist
 Francisco H. Licuanan, chairperson and Head of the Subic Bay Metropolitan Authority (2004–2006)
 Gilberto Llanto, former president of the Philippine Institute for Development Studies, economist
 Ben Malayang III, former environment undersecretary, president of Silliman University (2006–2018)
 Abubakar Mangelen, Commissioner for Maguindanaon of the National Commission on Muslim Filipinos (2018–2020) (previously endorsed Isko Moreno)
 Edu Manzano, Chairperson of the Optical Media Board (2004–2009), Vice Mayor of Makati, Metro Manila (1998–2001), actor, television host, 2010 vice presidential candidate under Lakas Kampi CMD, 2016 senatorial candidate, 2019 San Juan representative candidate under Pwersa ng Masang Pilipino
 Manuel C. Medina, former chairperson of the Philippine Reclamation Authority
 Heidi Mendoza, Under-Secretary-General of the United Nations Office of Internal Oversight Services (2015–2019), Commissioner of the Commission on Audit (2011–2015)
 Roberto Muldong, former chairperson of the Philippine Reclamation Authority
 Vitaliano N. Nañagas II, former chairman of the Development Bank of the Philippines and president of the Social Security System
 Jose Z. Osias, former director of the Poro Point Management Corporation
 Alexander A. Padilla, President and CEO of the Philippine Health Insurance Corporation (2013–2016)
 Emerson U. Palad, Undersecretary of Agriculture (2012–2016)
 Felicito Payumo, Chairperson of the Bases Conversion and Development Authority (2011–2012), chairperson and Administrator of the Subic Bay Metropolitan Authority (1998–2004), Bataan's 1st district representative (1987–1998)
 Asis Perez, Director of the Bureau of Fisheries and Aquatic Resources (2010–2016)
 Jose C. Reaño, Undersecretary of Agriculture for Operations on Livestock (2013–2016)
 Roland S. Recomono, former transportation undersecretary and Office of Transportation Security administrator
 Susan D. Reyes, former assistant executive secretary for the social secretary's office of the Office of the President of the Philippines
 Reynaldo B. Robles, member of the board of directors of the Philippine Reclamation Authority (2011–2017)
 Aika Robredo, Head Executive Assistant at the Office of Civil Defense (2014–2015), daughter of Leni Robredo
 Jorge V. Sarmiento, Deputy Commissioner of the National Telecommunications Commission (2003–2009), Chairperson of the Presidential Commission on Good Government (2001), lawyer
 Rene V. Sarmiento, Commissioner of the Commission on Elections (2006–2013), Presidential Adviser on the Peace Process officer-in-charge (2005–2006), member of the Philippine Constitutional Commission of 1986 and lawyer
 Ronaldo Solis, Commissioner of the National Telecommunications Commission (2004–2007)
 John Philip Sevilla, Commissioner of the Bureau of Customs (2013–2015)
 Luis F. Sison, chairperson of the Philippine Retirement Authority
 Gio Tingson, Chairperson of the National Youth Commission (2014–2016)
 Alfonso Tan Jr., Administrator of the Land Transportation Office (2015–2016)
 Virgilio A. Yuzon, former chairperson of the People's Television Network, former director of the National Development Company
 Carmen Reyes–Zubiaga, executive director of the National Council on Disability Affairs (2012–2020), persons with disability advocate, activist and 2022 senatorial candidate

Diplomats 

 Ma. Rosario C. Aguinaldo, Philippine Ambassador to Indonesia (2005–2014)
 Marilyn J. Alarilla, Philippine Ambassador to Turkey (2011–2013), Philippine Ambassador to Laos (2008–2012)
 Belen F. Anota, Philippine Ambassador to Australia (2011–2015), Philippine Ambassador to Singapore (2004–2008), Philippine Ambassador to Israel (2002–2004)
 Jorge V. Arizabal, Philippine Ambassador to Pakistan (2001–2005)
 Victoria Bataclan, Philippine Ambassador to Belgium and Luxembourg and Head of the Philippine Mission to the European Union (2011–2018), Philippine Ambassador to Norway and Iceland (2007–2009), Philippine Consul-General in Hong Kong (1999–2003)
 Estrella A. Berenguel, Philippine Ambassador to Vietnam (2005–2010), Philippine Consul-General in Hong Kong (1996–1999)
 Mary Jo A. Bernardo-Aragon, Philippine Ambassador to Thailand (2012–2019), Philippine Consul-General in Los Angeles (2007–2012)
 Eva G. Betita, former Philippine ambassador to Brazil
 Sonia C. Brady, Undersecretary of Foreign Affairs for Policy (2003–2006), Philippine Ambassador to China (2006–2010, 2011–2012), Philippine Ambassador to Thailand (2002–2003), Philippine Ambassador to Myanmar (1995–1999)
 Blesila C. Cabrera, Philippine Consul-General in Honolulu (2004–2010)
 Susan O. Castrence, Philippine Ambassador to South Korea (2006–2007)
 Maria Zeneida Collinson, Philippine Ambassador to Austria and Permanent Representative of the Philippine Mission to the United Nations Office at Vienna, the International Atomic Energy Agency, the United Nations Industrial Development Organization, and the Comprehensive Nuclear-Test-Ban Treaty Organization (2015–2017); Philippine Ambassador to Sweden (2007–2012)
 Esteban B. Conejos Jr., former permanent representative of the Philippines to the World Trade Organization, Undersecretary for Foreign Affairs
 Macarthur F. Corsino, former Philippine ambassador to Cuba
 Claro S. Cristobal, Philippine Ambassador to Egypt (2011–2015), Philippine Consul-General in Hong Kong (2009–2011), Philippine Consul-General in New York City (2018–2020)
 Petronila P. Garcia, Philippine Ambassador to Canada (2014–2020), Philippine Ambassador to Israel (2007–2011), Philippine Ambassador to Egypt (2004–2007), Philippine Consul-General in New York City (2020–2021)
 Uriel Norman R. Garibay, former Philippine ambassador to Kenya
 Leslie B. Gatan, Philippine Ambassador to Canada (2011–2014)
 Sahid S. Glang, former Philippine ambassador to Bahrain
 Lourdes Gutierrez-Morales, former Philippine ambassador to Cambodia
 Danilo T. Ibayan, former Philippine consul-general in Macau
 Eleanor L. Jaucian, former Philippine ambassador to Hungary
 Macabangkit B. Lanto, Philippine Ambassador to Egypt (1999–2001)
 Eduardo M. Maglaya, Philippine Ambassador to Bahrain (2003–2009), Philippine Chargé d' Affaires to Egypt (2010–2011)
 Bayani V. Mangibin, former Philippine ambassador to Seychelles, former Philippine ambassador to Kenya
 Delia Meñez-Rosal, former Philippine ambassador to Mexico
 Clemencio F. Montesa, former Philippine ambassador to Belgium and head of the Philippine Mission to the European Union
 Aurora Navarro-Tolentino, former Philippine ambassador to Switzerland
 Cristina G. Ortega, Philippine Ambassador to France and Permanent Delegate to UNESCO (2011–2014), Philippine Ambassador to Belgium and the Head of the Philippine Mission to the European Union (2006–2010), Philippine Ambassador to Australia (2004–2006)
 Olivia V. Palala, former Philippine ambassador to Jordan and Palestine, former Philippine consul-general in Chongqing
 Laura Quiambao-Del Rosario, Undersecretary of Foreign Affairs for International Economic Relations (2011–2010), president of Miriam College (2020–present)
 Cecilia B. Rebong, Permanent Representative of the Philippines to the United Nations Office at Geneva (2013–2016)
 Crescente R. Relacion, former Philippine ambassador to Qatar
 Virgilio A. Reyes, Jr., Philippine Ambassador to South Africa (2003–2009), Philippine Ambassador to Italy (2011–2014)
 Maria Rowena M. Sanchez, former Philippine ambassador to Turkey
 Melita Sta. Maria-Thomeczek, Philippine Ambassador to Germany (2015–2018)
 Zenaida Tacorda-Rabago, Philippine Ambassador to Bangladesh (2008–2010)
 Amado Tolentino Jr., Philippine Ambassador to Qatar (1999–2002), delegate to the Philippine Constitutional Convention of 1971, editor
 Alejandro Vicente, former Philippine ambassador to Libya
 Wilfrido V. Villacorta, Philippine Ambassador and Permanent Representative to the ASEAN (2010–2012), Deputy Secretary-General of the ASEAN (2003–2006), member of the Philippine Constitutional Commission of 1986, Dean of the De La Salle University College of Liberal Arts (1983–1986)
 Hector K. Villaroel, Philippine Ambassador to France (1995–2007)
 Jaime J. Yambao, Philippine Ambassador to Laos (1997–2001)

Philippine Congress

Senate 

 Bam Aquino, Senator of the Philippines (2013–2019), Chairperson of the National Youth Commission (2003–2006), television host, social entrepreneur, nephew of President Corazon Aquino, cousin of President Benigno Aquino III and campaign manager of the Leni Robredo 2022 presidential campaign
 Rodolfo Biazon, Senator of the Philippines (1992–1995, 1998–2010), Muntinlupa representative (2010–2016), 21st Chief of Staff of the Armed Forces of the Philippines (1991) (previously endorsed Panfilo Lacson)
 Nikki Coseteng, Senator of the Philippines (1992–2001), Quezon City's 3rd district representative (1987–1992), art gallerist and dealer
 Leila de Lima, Senator of the Philippines (2016–present), Secretary of Justice (2010–2015), Chairperson of the Commission on Human Rights (2008–2010), recipient of the Liberal International's Prize For Freedom in 2018, 2022 senatorial candidate under Team Robredo–Pangilinan
 Franklin Drilon, Senator of the Philippines (1995–2007, 2010–present), Senate Minority Leader (2017–present), President pro tempore of the Senate (2016–2017), President of the Senate (2000, 2001–2006, 2013–2016), Senate Majority Leader (1998–2000), Executive Secretary (1991–1992), Secretary of Justice (1990–1991, 1992–1995), Secretary of Labor and Employment (1990–1991, 1992–1995), vice-chair of the Liberal Party (2017–present)
 Dick Gordon, Senator of the Philippines (2004–2010, 2016–present), Chairman of the Philippine Red Cross (2004–present), Secretary of Tourism (2001–2004), Chairman of the Subic Bay Metropolitan Authority (1992–1998), Mayor of Olongapo (1980–1986, 1988–1993), delegate to the Philippine Constitutional Convention of 1971, Chairman of the Bagumbayan–VNP, 2022 senatorial candidate under Team Robredo–Pangilinan
 Risa Hontiveros, Senator of the Philippines (2016–present), Akbayan party-list representative (2004–2010), 2022 senatorial candidate under Team Robredo–Pangilinan, activist
 Joey Lina, Senator of the Philippines (1987–1995), Secretary of the Interior and Local Government (2001–2004), Governor of Laguna (1995–2001), Governor of Metro Manila (1986–1987), 2022 Ang Komadrona party-list representative nominee and radio personality
 Ramon Magsaysay Jr., Senator of the Philippines (1995–2007), Zambales representative (1965–1969), businessman, son of President Ramon Magsaysay
 Serge Osmeña, Senator of the Philippines (1995–2007, 2010–2016), grandson of President Sergio Osmeña (previously endorsed Isko Moreno)
 Wigberto Tañada,  Senator of the Philippines (1987–1995), Senate Minority Leader (1992–1995), Quezon's 4th district representative (1995–2001)
 Antonio Trillanes, Senator of the Philippines (2007–2019), 2022 senatorial candidate under Team Robredo–Pangilinan, retired lieutenant of the Philippine Navy

House of Representatives 
 Francis Gerald Abaya, Cavite's 1st district representative (2013–present), great-grandson of President Emilio Aguinaldo
 Beng Abueg, Palawan's 2nd district representative (2019–2022)
 Frederick Abueg, Palawan's 2nd district representative (2013–2019)
 Maria Fe Abunda, Eastern Samar representative (2019–present)
 Ma. Lourdes Acosta-Alba, Bukidnon's 1st district representative (2013–2022)
 Alex Advincula, Cavite's 3rd district representative (2013–2022)
 Irvin Alcala, Quezon's 2nd district representative (2010–2013)
 Gary Alejano, Magdalo party-list representative (2013–2019), 2019 senatorial candidate under Otso Diretso, former captain of the Philippine Marine Corps
 Pantaleon Alvarez, Davao del Norte's 1st district representative (1998–2001, 2019–present), Speaker of the House of Representatives (2016–2018), Secretary of Transportation and Communications (2001–2002), President of the Partido para sa Demokratikong Reporma (2021–present) (previously endorsed Panfilo Lacson; endorsed Tito Sotto for vice president)
 Isagani Amatong, Zamboanga del Norte's 3rd district representative (2013–2022), Governor of Zamboanga del Norte (1986–1995, 1998–2004), Councilor of Dipolog, Zamboanga del Norte (1984–1986)
 Tomas Apacible, Batangas's 1st district representative (2010–2013), Commissioner of the Bureau of Customs (1991–1992)
 Sol Aragones, Laguna's 3rd district representative (2013–2022), 2022 Laguna gubernatorial candidate (Nacionalista), former broadcast journalist
 Amado S. Bagatsing, Manila's 5th district representative (1987–1998, 2007–2016), 2022 Manila mayoral candidate
 Cristal Bagatsing, Manila's 5th district representative (2016–2022)
 Teddy Baguilat, Ifugao representative (2010–2019), Governor of Ifugao (2001–2004, 2007–2010), Mayor of Kiangan, Ifugao (1995–2001), Vice President for Internal Affairs of the Liberal Party (2017–present), 2022 senatorial candidate under Team Robredo–Pangilinan
 Julienne Baronda, Iloilo City representative (2019–present), Assistant Majority Floor Leader (2019–present), former councilor of Iloilo City
 Elpidio Barzaga Jr., Cavite's 4th district representative (2010–2016, 2019–present), Cavite's 2nd district representative (2007–2010), Mayor of Dasmariñas, Cavite (1998–2007, 2016–2019), president of the National Unity Party (previously endorsed Sara Duterte for vice president)
 Alfel Bascug, Agusan del Sur's 1st district representative (2019–present) (endorsed Sara Duterte for vice president)
 Kit Belmonte, Quezon City's 6th district representative (2013–2022), secretary-general of the Liberal Party
 Tawi Billones, Capiz's 1st district representative (2016–present)
 Gabriel Bordado, Camarines Sur's 3rd district representative (2016–present), Vice Mayor of Naga, Camarines Sur (2004–2013)
 Narciso Bravo Jr., Masbate's 1st district representative (2019–2022), Mayor of San Fernando, Masbate (2004–2013, 2013–2016)
 Ma. Vida V. Espinosa-Bravo, Masbate's 1st district representative (2013–2019)
 Fernando Cabredo, Albay's 3rd district representative (2019–present)
 Teodoro Casiño, Bayan Muna party-list representative (2004–2013), 2013 senatorial candidate, journalist, activist
 Frances Castro, ACT Teachers party-list representative (2016–present)
 Peping Cojuangco, Tarlac's 1st district representative (1961–1969, 1987–1998), Mayor of Paniqui, Tarlac (1959–1961), Vice Mayor of Paniqui (1957–1959), Councilor of Paniqui (1955–1957), 9th President of the Philippine Olympic Committee (2005–2018), businessman, brother of President Corazon Aquino, uncle of President Benigno Aquino III
 Neri Colmenares, Bayan Muna party-list representative (2007–2016), human rights lawyer, activist, 2022 senatorial candidate
 Eufemia Cullamat, Bayan Muna party-list representative (2019), tribal leader, farmer, activist
 Leo Rafael Cueva, Negros Occidental's 2nd district representative (2013–present)
 Sergio Dagooc, APEC party-list representative (2019–present)
 Paul Daza, Northern Samar's 1st district representative (2007–2010, 2019–present), Governor of Northern Samar (2010–2013)
 Raul Daza, Northern Samar's 1st district representative (1987–1998, 2010–2013, 2016–2019), House Deputy Speaker (1992–1995), Governor of Northern Samar (2001–2010), President of the Liberal Party (1994–1999)
 Presley de Jesus, Philreca party-list representative (2019–present)
 Monsour del Rosario, Makati's 1st district representative (2016–2019), Councilor of Makati (2010–2016), former taekwondo practitioner (1986 Asian Games bronze medalist), actor, 2022 senatorial candidate (previously endorsed Panfilo Lacson)
 Christopher de Venecia, Pangasinan's 4th district representative (2016–present), theater director, former actor (endorsed Sara Duterte for vice president)
 Gina de Venecia, Pangasinan's 4th district representative (2010–2016), humanitarian
 Jose de Venecia Jr., Pangasinan's 4th district representative (1987–1998, 2001–2010), Speaker of the House of Representatives (1992–1998, 2001–2008), Pangasinan's 2nd district representative (1969–1972), 1998 presidential candidate, former chairman of Lakas–CMD
 Lorenz Defensor, Iloilo's 3rd district representative (2019–present), Iloilo Provincial Board member (2016–2019)
 Adriano Ebcas, AKO PADAYON party-list representative (2019–present)
 Sarah Elago, Kabataan party-list representative (2016–present), former national president of the National Union of Students of the Philippines, activist
 Danilo Fernandez, Laguna's 1st district representative (2007–2016, 2019–present), House Deputy Speaker (2019–2020), Mayor of Santa Rosa (2016–2019), Vice Governor of Laguna (2001–2004), former actor
 Lawrence Fortun, Agusan del Norte's 1st district representative (2013–present), Vice Mayor of Butuan (2010–2013), Councilor of Butuan (2007–2010)
 Jocelyn Fortuno, Camarines Sur's 5th district representative (2019–present)
 Arnulf Bryan Fuentebella, Camarines Sur's 4th district representative (2019–present), Mayor of Tigaon, Camarines Sur (2007–2016)
 Ferdinand Gaite, Bayan Muna party-list representative (2019–present)
 Michael Gorriceta, Iloilo's 2nd district representative (2019–present), Mayor of Pavia, Iloilo (2013–2019)
 Ruwel Peter Gonzaga, Davao de Oro's 2nd district representative (2016–present) (previously endorsed Ping Lacson)
 Fernando Gonzalez, Albay's 3rd district representative (2010–2019)
 Magtanggol Gunigundo I, Valenzuela's 2nd district representative (2001–2004, 2007–2016), Valenzuela's defunct lone district representative (1998–2001), delegate to the Philippine Constitutional Convention of 1971
 Godofredo Guya, RECOBODA party-list representative (2019–present)
 Mujiv Hataman, Basilan representative (2019–present), House Deputy Speaker (2019–present), Governor of the Autonomous Region in Muslim Mindanao (2011–2019), Anak Mindanao party-list representative (2001–2010)
 Edcel Lagman, Albay's 1st district representative (1987–1998, 2004–2013, 2016–present), House Minority Leader (2010–2012)
 Glona Labadlabad, Zamboanga del Norte's 2nd district representative (2016–present)
 Salvador Leachon, Oriental Mindoro's 1st district representative (2013–present)
 Jocelyn Sy-Limkaichong, Negros Oriental's 1st district representative (2007–2013, 2016–present)
 Esmael Mangudadatu, Maguindanao's 2nd district representative (2019–present), Governor of Maguindanao (2010–2019), Mayor of Buluan, Maguindanao (1998–2007), Vice Mayor of Buluan (2007–2010) (previously endorsed Isko Moreno)
 Romeo Momo Sr., Construction Workers' Solidarity party-list representative (2019–present) (endorsed Sara Duterte for vice president)
 Maricel Natividad Nagaño, Nueva Ecija's 4th congressional district representative (2019–present)
 Sandy Ocampo, Manila's 6th district representative (1992–1995, 2010–2019)
 Satur Ocampo, Bayan Muna party-list representative (2001–2010), activist, journalist
 Ronnie Ong, Ang Probinsyano party-list representative (2019–present), representative candidate for Ako'y Pilipino partylist (previously endorsed Ping Lacson)
 Johnny Pimentel,  Surigao del Sur's 2nd district representative (2016–present), House Deputy Speaker (2019–2020), Governor of Surigao del Sur (2010–2016) (endorsed Sara Duterte for vice president)
 Eddiebong Plaza, Agusan del Sur's 2nd district representative (2019–present), Governor of Agusan del Sur (2010–2019; 2001-2007) (endorsed Sara Duterte for vice president)
 Sally Ponce Enrile, Cagayan's 1st district representative (2007–2010, 2013–2016), entrepreneur, artist
 Miro Quimbo, Marikina's 2nd district representative (2010–2019), House Deputy Speaker (2016–2018), President of the Home Development Mutual Fund (2002–2009), lawyer
 Stella Quimbo, Marikina's 2nd district representative (2019–present), Commissioner of the Philippine Competition Commission (2016–2019), economist
 Rufus Rodriguez, Cagayan de Oro's 2nd district representative (2007–2016, 2019–present), House Deputy Speaker (2020–present), Commissioner of the Bureau of Immigration (1998–2001), lawyer, President of the Centrist Democratic Party of the Philippines (endorsed Sara Duterte for vice president)
 Oscar Samson Rodriguez, Pampanga's 3rd district representative (1987–1992, 1995–2004, 2013–2016), Mayor of San Fernando, Pampanga (2004–2013)
 Joey Salceda, Albay's 2nd district representative (2016–present), Governor of Albay (2007–2016), Malacañang Chief of Staff (2007), Albay's 3rd district representative (1998–2007) (endorsed Sara Duterte for vice president)
 Hector Sanchez, Catanduanes representative (2019–present), Governor of Catanduanes (1998–2001)
 Cesar Sarmiento, Catanduanes representative (2010–2019)
 Josephine Sato, Occidental Mindoro representative (2001–2004, 2013–present), Governor of Occidental Mindoro (1992–2001, 2004–2013), Vice Governor of Occidental Mindoro (1988–1992), secretary-general of the Liberal Party (2015–2016), treasurer of the Liberal Party (2016–present)
 Bai Sandra A. Sema, Maguindanao's 1st district representative (2010–2019) and House Deputy Speaker (2016–2019) (previously endorsed Isko Moreno)
 Lorna Silverio, Bulacan's 3rd district representative (2001–2010, 2016–present), Mayor of San Rafael, Bulacan (2010–2013)
 Estrellita Suansing, Nueva Ecija's 1st district representative (2013–present)
 Erin Tañada, Quezon's 4th district representative (2004–2013), House Deputy Speaker (2010–2013)
 Antonio Tinio, ACT Teachers party-list representative (2010–2019), chairperson of the Alliance of Concerned Teachers, educator
 Arnel Ty, LPG Marketers Association party-list representative (2010–2019), Treasurer of the Partido para sa Demokratikong Reporma (2021–present) (previously endorsed Ping Lacson)
 Alfonso Umali Jr., Oriental Mindoro's 2nd district representative (2001−2010, 2019–present), Governor of Oriental Mindoro (2010–2019)
 Juliette Uy, Misamis Oriental's 2nd district representative (2013–present) (endorsed Sara Duterte for vice president)
 Tomasito Villarin, Akbayan party-list representative (2016–2019)
 Carlos Isagani Zarate, Bayan Muna party-list representative (2013–present), lawyer, activist

Judicial officials 

 Adolfo Azcuna, Associate Justice of the Supreme Court of the Philippines (2002–2009), Chancellor of the Philippine Judicial Academy (2009–present), delegate to the Philippine Constitutional Convention of 1971, member of the Philippine Constitutional Commission of 1986
 Antonio Carpio, Senior Associate Justice of the Supreme Court of the Philippines (2009–2019), Associate Justice of the Supreme Court of the Philippines (2001–2019)
 Conchita Carpio-Morales, 5th Ombudsman of the Philippines (2011–2018), Associate Justice of the Supreme Court of the Philippines (2002–2011)
 Hilario Davide Jr., 20th Chief Justice of the Philippines (1998–2005), Associate Justice of the Supreme Court of the Philippines (1991–1998), Chairperson of the Commission on Elections (1988–1990), 17th Permanent Representative of the Philippines to the United Nations (2007–2010), delegate to the Philippine Constitutional Convention of 1971, member of the Philippine Constitutional Commission of 1986
 Teresita Dy-Liacco Flores, Associate Justice of the Court of Appeals of the Philippines (2004–2011), delegate to the Philippine Constitutional Convention of 1971
 Simeon V. Marcelo, 3rd Ombudsman of the Philippines (2002–2005), Solicitor General of the Philippines (2001–2002), former president of the Philippine Bar Association (2009–2010)
 Theodore Te, Head of the Supreme Court of the Philippines Public Information Office (2012–2018), human rights lawyer

Local government officials

Provincial officials 

 Soraya Alonto Adiong, Governor of Lanao del Sur (2016–2019)
 Álvaro Antonio, Governor of Cagayan (2007–2013), Mayor of Alcala, Cagayan (1998–2007)
 Kaka Bag-ao, Governor of the Dinagat Islands (2019–present), Dinagat Islands representative (2013–2019), Akbayan party-list representative (2010–2013)
 Al Francis Bichara, Governor of Albay (1995–2004, 2016–present), Albay's 2nd district representative (2007–2016), Albay's 3rd district representative (1992–1995), Mayor of Ligao, Albay (1986–1992)
 Marc Douglas Cagas IV, Governor of Davao del Sur (2021–present), Vice Governor of Davao del Sur (2019–2021), Davao del Sur's 1st district representative (2007–2013)
 Santiago Cane Jr., Governor of Agusan del Sur (2019–present), Agusan del Sur Provincial Board member (1998-2007, 2016–2019), Vice Governor of Agusan del Sur (2007–2016) (endorsed Sara Duterte for vice president)
 Alex Castro, Bulacan Provincial Board member (2016–present), Councilor of Marilao (2007–2013), actor (previously endorsed Isko Moreno)
 Marilou Cayco, Governor of Batanes (2016–present)
 Rafael Coscolluela, Governor of Negros Occidental (1992–2001)
 Joseph Cua, Governor of Catanduanes (2007–2013, 2016–present)
 Hilario Davide III, Vice Governor of Cebu (2019–present), Governor of Cebu (2013–2019)
 Arthur Defensor Sr., Governor of Iloilo (1992–2001, 2010–2019), Iloilo's 3rd district representative (2001–2010)
 Arthur Defensor Jr., Governor of Iloilo (2019–present), Iloilo's 3rd district representative (2010–2019)
 Hazel dela Rosa, Northern Samar Provincial Board member (2019–present)
 Miguel Rene Dominguez, Governor of Sarangani (2004–2013)
 Murad Ebrahim, Chief Minister of Bangsamoro Autonomous Region in Muslim Mindanao (2019–present), MILF chairman (2003–present), UBJP chairman (2014–present)
 Ben Evardone, Governor of Eastern Samar (2019–present), Eastern Samar representative (2010–2019), Vice President for the Visayas of PDP–Laban (Duterte–Cusi faction) (2021–present)
 Daniel Fernando, Governor of Bulacan (2019–present), Vice Governor of Bulacan (2010–2019), Bulacan Provincial Board member (1998–2007), actor (previously endorsed Isko Moreno)
 Yeng Guiao, Vice Governor of Pampanga (2004–2013), Pampanga's 1st district representative (2013–2016),  Pampanga Provincial Board member (2001–2004), basketball head coach (NLEX Road Warriors, Philippines men's national basketball team), Philippine Basketball League commissioner (1997–2000)
 Hadjiman Hataman, Governor of Basilan (2016–present), Basilan representative (2010–2016)
 Edwin Jubahib, Governor of Davao del Norte (2019–present), Secretary-General of the Partido para sa Demokratikong Reporma (2021–present) (previously endorsed Panfilo Lacson)
 Eugenio Jose Lacson, Governor of Negros Occidental (2019–present), Vice Governor of Negros Occidental (2013–2019), Mayor of San Carlos, Negros Occidental (2001–2010) (endorsed Tito Sotto for vice president)
 Edcel Greco Lagman, Vice Governor of Albay (2016–present), Albay's 1st district representative (2013–2016)
 Mark Leviste, Vice Governor of Batangas (2007-2016, 2019–present), Batangas 4th District Provincial Board Member (2004-2007) (previously endorsed Sara Duterte for vice-president)
 Agnes Magpale, Vice Governor of Cebu (2011–2019), Acting Governor of Cebu (2012–2013), Cebu Provincial Board member (1992–2001, 2004–2011)
 Lalo Matugas, Governor of Surigao del Norte (1992–2001, 2019–present), Surigao del Norte's 1st district representative (2007–2016)
 Edwin Ongchuan, Governor of Northern Samar (2019–present), Northern Samar's 2nd district representative (2016–2019)
 Grace Padaca, Governor of Isabela (2004–2010), Commissioner of the Commission on Elections (2012–2014)
 Ed Panlilio, Governor of Pampanga (2007–2010)
 Mei Ling Quezon-Brown, Vice Governor of Siquijor (2016–present)
 Ding Roman, Governor of Bataan (1986–1992; 1993–2004)
 Kerby Javier Salazar, Cavite Provincial Board member (2019–present), President of the Katipunan ng Nagkakaisang Pilipino (2021–present)
 Maria Mikaela Singson-Mendoza, Ilocos Sur Provincial Board member (2016–present)
 Samuel Tortor, Vice Governor of Agusan del Sur (2016–present), Agusan del Sur Provincial Board member (2007–2016) (endorsed Sara Duterte for vice president)

City and municipal officials 
 Don Abalon, Mayor of San Roque, Northern Samar
 Sunshine Abcede, Councilor of Lucena, Quezon
 Jose Ivan Agda, Mayor of Borongan, Eastern Samar
 Margarita Aguinillo, Mayor of Buhi, Camarines Sur
 Emmanuel Alfelor, Mayor of Iriga, Camarines Sur
 Viviane Alvarez, Mayor of Oras, Eastern Samar
 Maria Luisa Angeles, Mayor of Bombon, Camarines Sur
 Estelita M. Aquino, Mayor of Moncada, Tarlac
 Tin Antonio, Mayor of Alcala, Cagayan (2019–present)
 Alan R. Arandia, Mayor of Pio Duran, Albay
 Rommel Arnado, Mayor of Kauswagan, Lanao del Norte (previously endorsed Panfilo Lacson)
 Joseph Ascutia, Mayor of Labo, Camarines Norte
 Rafael Asebias, Mayor of Quinapondan, Eastern Samar
 Ferdinand Avila, Mayor of San Isidro, Northern Samar
 Eunice Balbacon, Mayor of Paranas, Samar
 Teresita Bandal, Mayor of Capul, Northern Samar
 Danilo Baylon, Mayor of Candaba, Pampanga (2016–2019)
 Jennifer Barzaga, Mayor of Dasmariñas, Cavite (2019–present) (previously endorsed Sara Duterte for vice president)
 Tomas Bocago, Mayor of Sipocot, Camarines Sur
 Tom Bongalonta, Mayor of Pili, Camarines Sur
 Bernard Brioso, Mayor of Libmanan, Camarines Sur
 Nelson Buesa, Mayor of Garchitorena, Camarines Sur
 Dexter Calizo, Mayor of Balete, Aklan
 Rey Canaynay, Councilor of Dasmariñas, Cavite (2010–2019)
 Jose Blanco Cardenas, Mayor of Canlaon, Negros Oriental
 Shonny Carpeso, Mayor of Dolores, Eastern Samar
 Reynaldo Catacutan, Mayor of Capas, Tarlac
 Lenybelle Ceriola-Santos, Mayor of Malinao, Albay
 Beng Climaco, Mayor of Zamboanga City (2013–present), Zamboanga City's 2nd district representative (2007–2013), Vice Mayor of Zamboanga City (2004–2007) (endorsed Sara Duterte for vice president)
 Marilyn Co, Mayor of Caramoan, Camarines Sur
 Allan Contado, Mayor of Balangkayan, Eastern Samar
 Camalodin Jamal Dadayan, Mayor of Buadiposo-Buntong, Lanao del Sur
 Ronnie T. Dadivas, Mayor of Roxas, Capiz (2019–present), Vice Mayor of Roxas (2007–2013), Councilor of Roxas (2004–2007), member of the board of directors of the Philippine Health Insurance Corporation (2016–2018)
 Lito Dajalos, Former Vice Mayor of Garcia-Hernandez, Bohol
 Clarence Dato, Mayor of San Jose, Northern Samar
 Jimmy Deleña, Mayor of Presentacion, Camarines Sur
 Dante De Guzman, Councilor of Quezon City
 Juan Enero, Vice Mayor of Capalonga, Camarines Norte
 Salvador Escalante, Mayor of Cadiz, Negros Occidental
 Dennis Estaron, Mayor of San Julian, Eastern Samar
 Roland Boie Evardone, Mayor of Arteche, Eastern Samar
 Ver Evardone, Mayor of Jipapad, Eastern Samar
 Trina Fabic, Mayor of Odiongan, Romblon
 Loijorge Fagalan, Vice Mayor of Banton, Romblon
 Apple Francisco, 2022 Quezon City's 5th district council candidate
 Ronaldo Franco, Mayor of Pamplona, Camarines Sur
 Jaime Fresnedi, Mayor of Muntinlupa, Metro Manila (1998–2007, 2013–present), Vice Mayor of Muntinlupa (1987–1998)<ref
name="fresnedi2"></ref>
 Bimbo Fernandez, City Administrator of Cebu City<ref
name="fresnedi"></ref>
 John Fuentebella, Mayor of Sagñay, Camarines Sur
 Pamela Fuentebella, Mayor of Tigaon, Camarines Sur
 Ronald Galicia, Mayor of Rapu-Rapu, Albay
 Godofredo Garado, Mayor of Maydolong, Eastern Samar
 Justin Gatuslao, Mayor of Himamaylan, Negros Occidental
 Gil Germino, Mayor of Can-avid, Eastern Samar
 Efren Gica, Mayor of Dumanjug, Cebu
 Allan Go, Mayor of Ocampo, Camarines Sur
 Gilbert Go, Mayor of Giporlos, Eastern Samar
 Clarita Gomba, Mayor of Gamay, Northern Samar
 Annaliza Gonzales-Kwan, Mayor of Guiuan, Eastern Samar
 Patricia Gonzalez-Alsua, Mayor of Ligao, Albay
 Clara Gremio, Mayor of Bobon, Northern Samar
 Raymund Gumboc, Vice Mayor of Pandan, Antique
 Edwin Hamor, Mayor of Casiguran, Sorsogon; 2022 Sorsogon gubernatorial candidate
 Chesskha Hernandez, Vice Mayor of Calauan, Laguna
 Leo Jarito, Mayor of Silvino Lobos, Northern Samar
 Rosendo Labadlabad, Mayor of Sindangan, Zamboanga del Norte (2019–present), Zamboanga del Norte's 2nd district representative (2007–2016)
 Krisel Lagman-Luistro, Mayor of Tabaco, Albay; Albay's 1st district representative (1998–2004)
 Ayran Lantud, Mayor of Pantao Ragat, Lanao del Norte
 Nelson S. Legacion, Mayor of Naga, Camarines Sur
 Kaye Ann Legaspi, Councilor of Olongapo, Zambales, Vice President for Youth of Aksyon Demokratiko (2021–present) (previously endorsed Isko Moreno; endorses Sara Duterte for vice president)
 Ronin Leviste, Vice Mayor, Lian, Batangas (2022–present) (previously endorsed Sara Duterte for vice-president)
 Tito Luneza, Mayor of San Vicente, Northern Samar
 Mario Madera, Mayor of Mondragon, Northern Samar
 Alfredo Marañon, Jr., Mayor of Sagay, Negros Occidental
 Wilfredo Maronilla, Mayor of Libon, Albay
 Mariano Martinez, Mayor of San Remigio, Cebu
 Lilian Matamorosa, Mayor of Lupi, Camarines Sur
 Maria Luisa Menzon, Mayor of Lapinig, Northern Samar
 Melchor Mergal, Mayor of Salcedo, Eastern Samar
 Gerardo Miranda, Mayor of Rosario, Northern Samar
 Nora T. Modomo, Mayor of Santa Ignacia, Tarlac
 Oscar Moreno, Mayor of Cagayan de Oro (2013–present), Governor of Misamis Oriental (2004–2013), Misamis Oriental's 1st district representative (1998–2004)
 Ferdinand Amante, Jr., Mayor of Butuan (2010-2016)
 Edwin Santiago, Mayor of San Fernando, Pampanga (2013–present), Vice Mayor of San Fernando (2004–2013), Councilor of San Fernando (1988–1998)
 Thelma Nicart, Mayor of San Policarpio, Eastern Samar
 Harris Ongchuan, Mayor of Laoang, Northern Samar
 Maria Rosario Ochoa-Montejo, Mayor of Pulilan, Bulacan
 Bernadeth Olivares, Councilor of San Pedro, Laguna
 Ann Gemma Ongjoco, Mayor of Guinobatan, Albay
 Antolin Oreta III, Mayor of Malabon, Metro Manila (2012–present), Vice Mayor of Malabon (2010–2012), nephew of President Corazon Aquino and cousin of President Benigno Aquino III
 Margot Osmeña, Acting Mayor of Cebu City, Cebu (2016), Member of the Cebu City Council from the 2nd district (2010–2019), 2022 Cebu City mayoral candidate under LDP
 Tomas Osmeña, Mayor of Cebu City, Cebu (1988–1995, 2001–2010, 2016–2019), Cebu City's 2nd district representative (2010–2013), grandson of President Sergio Osmeña
 Cothera Palafox-Yamamoto, Mayor of Bani, Pangasinan
 Ana Palloc, Mayor of Lope de Vega, Northern Samar
 Marcel Pan, Mayor of Goa, Camarines Sur
 Delfin Pilapil, Mayor of Lagonoy, Camarines Sur
 Karen Polinga, Mayor of Siruma, Camarines Sur
 Richard Quezon, Mayor of Siquijor, Siquijor
 Edwin Quiminales, Mayor of Mercedes, Eastern Samar
 Thaddeus Ramos, Mayor of Ragay, Camarines Sur
 Allan Rellon, Mayor of Tagum, Davao del Norte
 Felipe Antonio Remollo, Mayor of Dumaguete, Negros Oriental
 Anthony Reyes, Mayor of Milaor, Camarines Sur
 Antonio Delos Reyes, Mayor of Biri, Northern Samar
 Armando Romano, Mayor of Bacacay, Albay
 Noel Rosal, Mayor of Legazpi, Albay (2001–2010, 2013–present), city administrator of Legazpi (2010–2013)
 Francisco Rosales, Mayor of Catarman, Northern Samar
 Sammy Rosario, Mayor of Binmaley, Pangasinan
 Edito Saludaga, Mayor of Lavezares, Northern Samar
 Heracleo Santiago, Mayor of Maslog, Eastern Samar
 Philip Señar, Mayor of Magarao, Camarines Sur
 Felipe Sosing, Mayor of Pambujan, Northern Samar
 Jose Arturo Suan, Mayor of Allen, Northern Samar
 Amenodin Sumagayan, Vice Mayor of Taraka, Lanao del Sur
 Arlito Tan, Mayor of Las Navas, Northern Samar
 John Tejano, Mayor of Mapanas, Northern Samar
 Jerry Treñas, Mayor of Iloilo City, Iloilo (2019–present), Iloilo City representative (2010–2019)
 Flora Ty, Mayor of General MacArthur, Eastern Samar
 Gina Ty, Mayor of Taft, Eastern Samar
 Toto Veloso, Vice Mayor of Tagbilaran, Bohol
 Galahad Vicencio, Mayor of Catubig, Northern Samar
 Jaime Villanueva, Mayor of Tiwi, Albay
 Javier Zacate, Mayor of Sulat, Eastern Samar

Military officials 

 Emmanuel Bautista, 44th Chief of Staff of the Armed Forces of the Philippines (2013–2014)
 Jessie Dellosa, 43rd Chief of Staff of the Armed Forces of the Philippines (2011–2013)
 William Hotchkiss III, 24th Commanding General of the Philippine Air Force (1996–1999), Director–General of the Civil Aviation Authority of the Philippines (2012–2016)
 Hernando Iriberri, 46th Chief of Staff of the Armed Forces of the Philippines (2015–2016)
 Eduardo Oban, 42nd Chief of Staff of the Armed Forces of the Philippines (2011)
 Rommel Jude G. Ong, former vice commander of the Philippine Navy

Police officials 
 Ricardo C. Marquez, 18th Chief of the Philippine National Police (2015–2016)
 Luisito Palmera, Commissioner of the National Police Commission (2010–2016)
 Felipe L. Rojas Jr., Chairman of the Dangerous Drugs Board (2016), Deputy Director-General for Administration of the Philippine National Police (2013–2016)
 Reginald Villasanta, Undersecretary of the Office of the President of the Philippines and executive director of the Presidential Anti-Organized Crime Commission (2010–2016)

Political parties, organizations, and alliances 
 1Sambayan
 Achievers with Integrity Movement
 AGRI Party-List
 Akbayan Citizens' Action Party
 Ako Padayon Pilipino
 Ako'y Pilipino Party-List
 ANGKLA Party-List
 Anduyog
 APEC Partylist
 Bando Osmeña – Pundok Kauswagan (endorsed Tito Sotto for vice president)
 Centrist Democratic Party of the Philippines (endorsed Sara Duterte for vice president)
 Guardians Brotherhood (a faction of Guardians Brotherhood who endorsed Bongbong Marcos for president and Sara Duterte for vice president)
 Hukbong Federal (a faction of Hukbong Federal who endorsed Bongbong Marcos for president and Sara Duterte for vice president)
 Isang Mamamayan para kay Leni (IM k Leni) (a faction of Ikaw Muna Pilipinas who endorsed Isko Moreno)
 Katipunan ng Nagkakaisang Pilipino
 Kusog Bicolandia
 Liberal Party
 Magdalo Party-List
 Makabayan
 Manibela Party-List
 Moro Islamic Liberation Front (endorsed Sara Duterte for Vice President)
 Moro National Liberation Front (endorsed Sara Duterte for Vice President)
 Pambansang Lakas ng Kilusang Mamamalakaya ng Pilipinas (Pamalakaya)
 Partido Federal ng Pilipinas (Abubakar Mangelen-led faction) (previously endorsed Isko Moreno)
 Partido Manggagawa
 Partido para sa Demokratikong Reporma (previously endorsed Ping Lacson; endorsed Tito Sotto for vice president)
 Philreca Party-List
 Recoboda
 Rebolusyonaryong Alyansa Makabayan (previously endorsed Bongbong Marcos for president and Sara Duterte for vice president) 
 United Bangsamoro Justice Party

Non-political endorsements

Academics 

 Chel Diokno, lawyer, human rights advocate, chairperson of the Free Legal Assistance Group, founding dean of the De La Salle University College of Law (2009–2019), 2022 senatorial candidate under Team Robredo–Pangilinan
 Edmundo L. Fernandez, member of the De La Salle Brothers, president of De La Salle–College of Saint Benilde (2006–2007, 2020–present) and La Salle Green Hills
 Raquel Fortun, the first female forensic pathologist in the Philippines
 Augusto W. Go, lawyer, entrepreneur, president of the University of Cebu
 Gideon Lasco, medical anthropologist, opinion and editorial writer
 Marcelo V. Manimtim, Vincentian Roman Catholic priest, president of Adamson University (2015–present)
 Christopher C. Maspara, Roman Catholic priest of the Augustinian Recollect order, president of the University of San Jose–Recoletos
 Bienvenido Nebres, Roman Catholic priest of the Jesuit order, president of the Ateneo de Manila University (1993–2011), scientist, mathematician, National Scientist of the Philippines
 Bernard S. Oca, member of the De La Salle Brothers, president of De La Salle University (2021–present)
 Dionisia A. Rola, former chancellor of the University of the Philippines Visayas, the first Filipino to graduate from an Australian university, centenarian
 Florangel Rosario-Braid, former president and executive dean of the Asian Institute of Journalism and Communication, member of the Philippine Constitutional Commission of 1986, columnist
 Gilbert B. Sales, CICM Roman Catholic priest, president of Saint Louis University (2015–present)
 Karel San Juan, Roman Catholic priest of the Jesuit order, president of the Ateneo de Zamboanga University (2013–present)
 Henry H. Santiago, Roman Catholic priest of the Augustinian Recollect order, president of San Sebastian College – Recoletos
 Emanuel V. Soriano, president of the University of the Philippines (1979–1981)
 Mars P. Tan, Roman Catholic priest of the Jesuit order, president of Xavier University – Ateneo de Cagayan (2020–present), marine biologist
 Jose Ramon Villarin, Roman Catholic priest of the Jesuit order, president of the Ateneo de Manila University (2011–2020), physicist, member of the Intergovernmental Panel on Climate Change which received the 2007 Nobel Peace Prize
 Jose Gualberto I. Villasis, Roman Catholic priest, rector-president of the Aklan Catholic College
 Maria Marissa Viri, Roman Catholic nun, member of the Religious of the Virgin Mary, president of the University of the Immaculate Conception
 Roberto Yap, Roman Catholic priest of the Jesuit order, president of the Ateneo de Manila University (2020–present), president of Xavier University – Ateneo de Cagayan (2011–2020), economist

Activists and public figures 
 Teodoro C. Bacani, former bishop of the Roman Catholic Diocese of Novaliches, member of the Philippine Constitutional Commission of 1986
 Gang Badoy, radio and television personality, writer, businesswoman, mental health clinician, political advocate, founder of Rock Ed Philippines
 Rizalito David, lawyer and 2022 candidate for Vice–President of the Democratic Party of the Philippines (endorsed Tito Sotto for vice–president)
 Nelle Duterte, New Zealand-based physician, niece of President Rodrigo Duterte
 Ed Garcia, member of the Philippine Constitutional Commission of 1986, human rights activist, writer
 Elmer Labog, labor leader, activist, Chairman of Kilusang Mayo Uno, 2022 senatorial candidate
 Cheche Lazaro, broadcast journalist, co-founder and editor-at-large of Rappler
 Sonny Matula, labor leader, lawyer, National President of the Federation of Free Workers, 2022 senatorial candidate under Team Robredo–Pangilinan
 Tricia Robredo, physician, former sports reporter, daughter of Leni Robredo
 Jon-jon Rufino, businessman, LGBT rights advocate
 Gia Sison, physician, occupational medicine doctor
 Jaime Tadeo, member of the Philippine Constitutional Commission of 1986, peasants and farmers' rights activist
 Mitzi Jonelle Tan, climate justice activist, member of the School Strike for Climate movement

Business executives and leaders 
 Laurent Benig, founder and CEO of Laurent Cosmetics
 Martine Cajucom-Ho, model, businesswoman, fashion designer, social media influencer, creative director of Sunnies Studios
 Gonzalo Catan Jr., innovator, entomologist, founder and CEO of the Manila Pest Control, delegate to the Philippine Constitutional Convention of 1971
 Reese Fernandez-Ruiz, president and co-founder of Rags2Riches
 Angelina Mead King, model, managing director of Victoria Court, LGBT rights advocate
 Jose Teodoro K. Limcaoco, president and CEO of the Bank of the Philippine Islands
 Tony Meloto, founder of Gawad Kalinga, social entrepreneur, activist
 Jinno Mina, regional manager for Southeast Asia of Ditto Music
 Ana Patricia Non, social entrepreneur, founder of the Maginhawa community pantry
 Anthony Pangilinan, chairman of BusinessWorks, motivational speaker, television personality, brother of Francis Pangilinan
 Katrina Razon, businesswoman, founder and CEO of KSR Ventures, disc jockey, yoga instructor
 Rissa Mananquil Trillo, entrepreneur, author
 Jessica Wilson, model, businesswoman, co-founder, brand manager of Sunnies Face
 Jonathan Yabut, entrepreneur, author, motivational speaker, winner of The Apprentice Asia

Fashion figures 
 Martin Bautista, fashion designer
 JC Buendia, fashion designer
 Zarah Juan, accessories designer
 Jigs Mayuga, make-up artist
 Margaux Medina, celebrity stylist
 Sam Rivera, fashion designer

Media personalities 

 Dong Abay, rock musician, singer-songwriter (founding member of Yano)
 Carla Abellana, actress
 Astarte Abraham, theater actress, voice actress
 Susan Africa, actress
 Karla Aguas, radio personality
 Yayo Aguila, actress
 LA Aguinaldo, model
 Marvin Agustin, actor and restaurateur
 Angela Alarcon, actress
 Ivana Alawi, actress
 JC Alcantara, actor
 Kyline Alcantara, actress
 Leila Alcasid, songwriter
 Ogie Alcasid, singer-songwriter, actor, host
 Bea Alonzo, actress
 Pinky Amador, actress, singer, model, host
 Boots Anson-Roa, actress, columnist, 2004 senatorial candidate
 Angel Aquino, actress, model, activist
 Kris Aquino, television host, actress, producer, socialite, businesswoman, daughter of President Corazon Aquino, sister of President Benigno Aquino III
 John Arcilla, actor
 Delamar Arias, former radio personality
 Autotelic, rock band
 Rita Avila, actress, author
 Jong Azores, singer
 RK Bagatsing, actor
 Claudia Barretto, singer
 Kira Balinger, actress
 Julia Barretto, actress, singer
 Marjorie Barretto, actress, Councilor of Caloocan from the 2nd district (2007–2013)
 Bayang Barrios, singer and musician
Christian Bautista, singer, actor, TV host
 Ben&Ben, band
 Janine Berdin, singer
 Kris Bernal, actress
 Kathryn Bernardo, actress, singer
 Bea Binene, actress
 Rammy Bitong, radio personality and DJ
 Jameson Blake, actor
 The Bloomfields, pop rock band
 AC Bonifacio, dancer, singer, internet personality
 Andrea Brillantes, actress
 K Brosas, television host, comedian, singer, actress
 Shamaine Buencamino, actress, mental health advocate
 Ely Buendia, musician, lead vocalist and guitarist of Eraserheads
 Noel Cabangon, folk singer, composer
 Alex Calleja, stand-up comedian
 Iza Calzado, actress, television host, dancer, model
 Elijah Canlas, actor
 Melai Cantiveros, television host, actress
 Lolita Carbon, singer-songwriter
 Dolly Ann Carvajal, entertainment columnist
 Albie Casiño, actor
 Ella Cayabyab, actress
 Ryza Cenon, actress
 DJ Chacha, radio personality
 Jose Mari Chan, singer-songwriter, business executive
 Ricci Chan, actor, singer
 Dawn Chang, actress, dancer
 Chicosci, band
Kim Chiu, actress, singer, television host
 David Chua, actor, model, director, basketball player
 Color it Red, band
 Noel Comia Jr., actor
 The Company, musical vocal group
 KC Concepcion, actress, singer, television host, humanitarian, stepdaughter of Francis Pangilinan (has openly endorsed Pangilinan only)
 Sam Concepcion, singer, actor, television personality
 Yeng Constantino, singer-songwriter, host
 Benedict Cua, vlogger, actor and singer
 Sharon Cuneta, actress, singer, television host, socialite, wife of Francis Pangilinan
 Anne Curtis, actress, model, television host, singer, UNICEF Goodwill Ambassador
 Curtismith, rapper, singer-songwriter
 Johnoy Danao, musician
 Ebe Dancel, musician, former member of Sugarfree
 Dingdong Dantes, actor and host
 The Dawn, rock band
 DayDream, P-pop girl group
 Enchong Dee, actor, model
 Jex de Castro, singer
 Jane De Leon, actress, model
 Tweetie de Leon-Gonzalez, former model, television host, entrepreneur
 Kokoy de Santos, actor, television personality
 RJ dela Fuente, singer
 JC de Vera, actor, host, model
 Ashley Diaz, actress
 Francine Diaz, actress
 Ogie Diaz, comedian, actor, entertainment reporter
 Dicta License, rock band
 Zephanie Dimaranan, singer, Idol Philippines winner
 Charlie Dizon, actress
 Mylene Dizon, actress
 Robi Domingo, VJ, actor, dancer, television host
 Tippy Dos Santos, singer, actress
 Chuckie Dreyfus, actor
 Bullet Dumas, singer-songwriter
 Jason Dy, singer and actor
 Kyle Echarri, actor and singer
 Bituin Escalante, actress, host
 Vivoree Esclito, actress, singer, television personality
 John Estrada, actor
 Kaila Estrada, actress
 KD Estrada, actor, singer
 Jake Ejercito, actor, son of President Joseph Estrada
 Rhen Escaño, actress
 Darren Espanto, singer, runner-up in The Voice Kids
 Jaime Fabregas, actor, musical scorer
 Topper Fabregas, actor, theater director
 Seth Fedelin, actor
 Noel Ferrer, producer, talent manager
 Kimpoy Feliciano, YouTuber, actor
 Aya Fernandez, actress
 Chienna Filomeno, actress
 Marvin Fojas, TikTok personality, vlogger
 Chai Fonacier, singer and actress
 Tin Gamboa, radio personality
 Gabbi Garcia, actress, host, singer, vlogger
 Boboy Garovillo, composer, member of APO Hiking Society
 Elmer Gatchalian, screenwriter, playwright, editor, translator
 Xia Gaza, cosplayer
 Janno Gibbs, singer, actor
 Cherie Gil, actress
 Gloc-9, rapper, singer, songwriter
 Beatrice Gomez, beauty queen (Miss Universe Philippines 2021 winner), model, entrepreneur, sergeant of the Philippine Navy
 Shanaia Gomez, actress
 Jay Gonzaga, actor
 Bianca Gonzalez, model, television host
 Boom Gonzalez, radio personality and sports commentator
 Catriona Gray, beauty queen (Miss Universe 2018 winner), model, television host, singer, social advocate
 Janine Gutierrez, actress, television host, commercial model
 Robbie Guevara, theater actor, director, producer, writer, editor
 Mela Habijan, beauty queen (Miss Trans Global 2020 winner), writer, actress, content creator, 2016 candidate for Councilor of Marikina from its 2nd district (Nationalist People's Coalition)
 Syd Hartha, singer
 Quark Henares, director
 Hey Moonshine, rock band
 Viel Iligan-Velasquez, internet personality, vlogger
 Imago, rock band
 Agot Isidro, actress
 The Itchyworms, rock band
 Antoinette Jadaone, filmmaker
 Danny Javier, singer, member of APO Hiking Society
 Jose Javier Reyes, film director
 Jaya, soul singer, rapper, record producer, dancer, presenter
 Cedrick Juan, actor
 Juan Karlos, rock band
 DJ Jhaiho, radio personality
 Luke Jickain, model, actor
 Eunice Jorge, lead vocalist of Gracenote
 The Juans, band
 Kakie, musician, daughter of Francis Pangilinan
 Kamikazee, rock band
 Angela Ken, actress, singer-songwriter
 Kring Kim, host
 Helga Krapf, actress
 Krissy Achino, comedian and internet personality
 Kyla, singer
 Fatima Lagueras, singer
 Joel Lamangan, film director, television director, actor
 John Lapus, actor, host, comedian, film and television director
 Vance Larena, actor
 Maricel Laxa, actress, sister-in-law of Francis Pangilinan
 Leanne & Naara, musical duo
 Kuh Ledesma, singer, actress
 Celeste Legaspi, singer
 Jim Libiran, film director, writer, poet
 David Licauco, actor, model
 Angel Locsin, actress, activist
 Rio Locsin, actress
 Lola Amour, rock band
 Mara Lopez, actress, surfer
 Maria Isabel Lopez, beauty queen (Miss Universe Philippines 1982 winner), actress, model
 Ella Eiveren Lubag, model, activist
 Nadine Lustre, actress
 Macoy Dubs, comedian
 Arkin Magalona, singer
 Elmo Magalona, actor, singer
 Maxene Magalona, actress, model, host and yoga instructor
 Pia Magalona, actress, composer
 Saab Magalona, actress, vlogger, singer, member of Cheats
 Jolina Magdangal, singer, actress, television presenter, entrepreneur
 Shaina Magdayao, actress, singer, model
 Inka Magnaye, voice actress
 Belle Mariano, actress, singer, model
 Carmi Martin, actress, model, comedian
 Leo Martinez, actor, comedian, director
 Mayonnaise, rock band
 Melissa Mendez, actress, 2022 candidate for Councilor of Quezon City from its 2nd district (Aksyon Demokratiko)
 Aljon Mendoza, actor
 Gabe Mercado, actor
 Jennylyn Mercado, actress, singer, songwriter
 Kelsey Merritt, model, first Filipino to walk in the Victoria's Secret Fashion Show
 MilesExperience, rock band
 Mimiyuuuh, YouTuber
 Margaux Montana, actress
 Moonstar88, rock band
 Arlene Muhlach, actress
 Nuel Crisostomo Naval, director
 Leah Navarro, singer, activist
 Elha Nympha, singer, The Voice Kids (Philippine season 2) winner
 Miles Ocampo, actress
 Jane Oineza, actress, model, singer
 Kaori Oinuma, actress, model
 Gani Oro, newscaster, 2022 candidate for Councilor of Quezon City from its 5th district (Aksyon Demokratiko)
 Daniel Padilla, actor, singer
 Gabby Padilla, actress
 Phi Palmos, theater actor, singer, writer
 Angelica Panganiban, actress, television host
 Candy Pangilinan, actress, comedienne
 Donny Pangilinan, actor, model, singer, television host, nephew of Francis Pangilinan
 Hannah Pangilinan, YouTuber, niece of Francis Pangilinan
 Rochelle Pangilinan, dancer, former member of the SexBomb Dancers
 Jim Paredes, singer-songwriter, member of APO Hiking Society
 Bodjie Pascua, actor, former television host
 Piolo Pascual, actor, singer, model 
 Heaven Peralejo, actress, singer
 Paula Peralejo, former actress, businesswoman
 Rica Peralejo, writer, content creator, former actress
 Cherry Pie Picache, actress
 Aurora Pijuan, beauty queen (Miss International 1970 winner), model, activist
 Pipay, vlogger, TikTok personality
 Pokwang, comedian, actress, television host, singer
 Camille Prats, actress, television personality
 Yassi Pressman, actress, singer, host
 Victor Pring, radio host, music producer, entrepreneur, 2022 candidate for Councilor of Quezon City from its 2nd district (independent)
 Prettier Than Pink, musical group
 Floy Quintos, playwright, film and television director, poet
 Precious Lara Quigaman, actress, host, beauty queen (Miss International 2005 winner)
 Patrick Quiroz, actor, singer
 Sky Quizon, internet personality
 Maris Racal, actress, television personality, singer
 Khalil Ramos, actor, singer
 Miko Raval, model, actor
 Lance Reblando, singer, actor
 Chloe Redondo, singer
 FM Reyes, director
 Mandy Reyes, director
 Rivermaya, rock band
 Marian Rivera, actress
 Rapahel Robes, model, actor
 Vic Robinson, singer, actor
 Ana Roces, actress
 Bretman Rock, beauty influencer, social media personality
 Anthony Rosaldo, singer, actor and model
 SAB, singer-songwriter
 Mika Salamanca, TikTok personality
 Rhap Salazar, singer, former child actor
 Randy See, model, actor, TV show host, Mr. Chinatown 2013
 Donita Rose, actress, chef, former VJ
 John Mark Saga, singer
 Janella Salvador, actress, singer, television personality
 Maja Salvador, actress (endorsed Tito Sotto for vice–president)
 Sam YG, radio and television personality
 Paolo Sandejas, singer 
 Julie Anne San Jose, actress, singer
 Sharlene San Pedro, actress, singer
 Migs Santilan, Radio DJ
Erik Santos, singer
 Sitti, singer, actress
 Aicelle Santos, singer, actress
 Romnick Sarmenta, actor
 Liza Soberano, actress
 Fifth Solomon, actor, director
 Carmen Soo, model, actress
 Maricel Soriano, actress, model, television host
 Jodi Sta. Maria, actress
 Tanya Markova, rock band
 Myke Tatung, celebrity chef
 Sharwin Tee, celebrity chef
 Kakki Teodoro, actress, entrepreneur
 Dennis Trillo, actor, model
 Tropical Depression, reggae band
 True Faith, rock band
 Mitch Valdes, singer, actress, television presenter
 Nikki Valdez, actress, singer
 Gabriel Valenciano, dancer, nephew of Francis Pangilinan
 Gary Valenciano, singer-songwriter, dancer, actor, host, UNICEF Goodwill Ambassador, brother-in-law of Francis Pangilinan
 Kiana Valenciano, singer-songwriter, niece of Francis Pangilinan
 Tuesday Vargas, singer, actress and comedian
 Janina Vela, YouTuber
 Regine Velasquez, singer, actress, producer
 Kylie Verzosa, beauty queen (Miss International 2016 winner), model, actress
 Vice Ganda, comedian, host, actor, singer
 Loi Villarama, comedian, entertainment reporter, YouTuber
 Jona Viray, singer
 Nyoy Volante, singer-songwriter
 The Vowels They Orbit, alternative pop band
 Maureen Wroblewitz, actress, model, beauty queen (Miss Universe Philippines 2021 runner-up, Asia's Next Top Model (season 5) winner)
 Pia Wurtzbach, beauty queen (Miss Universe 2015 winner), model, actress
 Tim Yap, media personality, entrepreneur
 Lauren Young, actress, model
 Amanda Zamora, actress

Sports figures 

 Johnny Abarrientos, former basketball player (Alaska Aces, Philippines men's national basketball team), basketball assistant coach (FEU Tamaraws, Magnolia Hotshots)
 Maruja Banaticla, former volleyball player (UST Golden Tigresses, Smart-Maynilad Net Spikers)
 Kathy Bersola, volleyball player (UP Lady Fighting Maroons, Perlas Spikers)
 Tots Carlos, volleyball player (UP Lady Fighting Maroons, Creamline Cool Smashers)
 Mozzy Crisologo-Ravena, volleyball analyst, former volleyball player (UST Golden Tigresses, Philippines women's national volleyball team)
 Apple David, sports reporter, host
 Bea de Leon, volleyball player (Ateneo Lady Eagles, Choco Mucho Flying Titans)
 Ayel Estrañero, volleyball player (UP Lady Fighting Maroons, Cignal HD Spikers)
 Jem Ferrer, volleyball player (Ateneo Lady Eagles, Choco Mucho Flying Titans)
 Ponggay Gaston, former volleyball player (Ateneo Lady Eagles, Choco Mucho Flying Titans)
 Dave Ildefonso, basketball player (Ateneo Blue Eagles, NU Bulldogs)
 Rex Intal, volleyball player (Ateneo Blue Spikers, Cignal HD Spikers, Philippines men's national volleyball team)
 Jojo Lastimosa, former basketball player (Alaska Milkmen, Philippines men's national basketball team), basketball assistant coach (NLEX Road Warriors)
 Denden Lazaro-Revilla, volleyball player (Ateneo Lady Eagles, Choco Mucho Flying Titans)
 Gia "Jeeya" Llanes, esports player (Philippines women's national esports team)
 Maddie Madayag, volleyball player (Ateneo Lady Eagles, Choco Mucho Flying Titans, Philippines women's national volleyball team)
 Ysay Marasigan, volleyball player (Cignal HD Spikers, Philippines men's national volleyball team)
 Jia Morado, volleyball player (Ateneo Lady Eagles, Creamline Cool Smashers, Philippines women's national volleyball team)
 Aiyana Perlas, sports reporter, host
 Ed Picson, retired sports commentator, columnist, president of the Association of Boxing Alliances in the Philippines
 Ish Polvorosa, volleyball player (Ateneo Blue Spikers, Cignal HD Spikers, Philippines men's national volleyball team)
 Olsen Racela, former basketball player (San Miguel Beermen, Philippines men's national basketball team), basketball coach (FEU Tamaraws, Barangay Ginebra San Miguel)
 Nikko Ramos, sports commentator, former radio personality, editor-in-chief of Slam Philippines
 Kiefer Ravena, basketball player (Ateneo Blue Eagles, NLEX Road Warriors, Shiga Lakestars, Philippines men's national basketball team)
 Chot Reyes, basketball head coach (TNT Tropang Giga, Philippines men's national basketball team), president of TV5 Network (2016–2019)
 Mika Reyes, volleyball player (De La Salle Lady Spikers, PLDT High Speed Hitters, Petron Blaze Spikers, Philippine women's national volleyball team)
 Camille Rodriguez, football player (Ateneo Lady Blue Booters, Kaya F.C., Philippines women's national football team)
 Sev Sarmenta, sports commentator, communications lecturer at the Ateneo de Manila University
 Jeushl Tiu, former volleyball player (De La Salle Lady Spikers, Generika-Ayala Lifesavers, Petro Gazz Angels)
 Karen Toyoshima, kendoka, actress
 Alyssa Valdez, volleyball player (Ateneo Lady Eagles, Creamline Cool Smashers, Philippines women's national volleyball team)
 Deanna Wong, volleyball player (Ateneo Lady Eagles, Choco Mucho Flying Titans, Philippines women's national volleyball team)

Visual artists, writers, and cultural workers 

 Gémino Abad, literary critic
 Pio Abad, visual artist, activist
 Emily Abrera, adwoman, chairman emeritus of McCann Worldgroup Philippines, President of the Cultural Center of the Philippines (2010–2018)
 Marvin Aceron, lawyer and executive publisher of San Anselmo Publications, Inc.
 Robert Alejandro, visual artist and television personality
 Virgilio S. Almario, author, poet, critic, translator, editor, teacher, cultural manager, National Artist for Literature, Chairperson of the Komisyon sa Wikang Filipino (2013–2020), Chairman of the National Commission for Culture and the Arts (2017–2019)
 Yñigo Miguel Almeda, poet
 Gina Apostol, novelist
 Joi Barrios, poet, activist, scriptwriter, actress, translator, and academic
 Merlinda Bobis, writer
 Lualhati Bautista, novelist
 Elmer Borlongan, visual artist
 Plet Bolipata Borlongan, visual artist
 Luis Cabalquinto, poet and writer
 Benedicto Cabrera, painter, National Artist for Visual Arts
 Ryan Cayabyab, conductor, composer, National Artist for Music
 Xiao Chua, public historian, academic, television personality
 Jose Dalisay Jr., writer, poet, activist
 Noel Romero del Prado, writer and author
 Luis H. Francia, poet, playwright, journalist, nonfiction writer
 Toym Imao, visual artist
 Jenny Jamora, theater actress, President and CEO of the Philippine Theater Actors Guild, Inc.
 Mookie Katigbak-Lacuesta, poet and nonfiction writer
 Kerwin King, visual artist, photographer
 Alex Lacson, poet, lawyer, businessman, civil society leader, 2022 senatorial candidate under Team Robredo–Pangilinan
 Moira Lang, film screenwriter and LGBT rights advocate
 Marra PL. Lanot, poet, essayist, and freelance journalist
 Matthew Lopez, art researcher, independent curator, art advisor, author
 Lisa Macuja-Elizalde, ballet dancer, businesswoman
 Raxenne Maniquiz, graphic designer, illustrator
 Leeroy New, visual artist
 Ambeth Ocampo, public historian, academic, cultural administrator, journalist, author, independent curator, Chairperson of the National Historical Commission of the Philippines (2002–2011), Chairman of the National Commission for Culture and the Arts (2005–2007)
 Bob Ong, author
 Bibeth Orteza, writer and director
 Mae Paner, performance artist, activist
 Kevin Eric Raymundo (alias Tarantadong Kalbo), graphic designer, comic book artist
 Alice Reyes, choreographer, dancer, teacher, director, producer, National Artist for Dance
 Ninotchka Rosca, author, poet, journalist, activist
 Ramon Santos, composer, ethnomusicologist, educator, National Artist for Music
 Beverly W. Siy, writer and translator
 Kenny Tai, artist
 Kidlat Tahimik, film director, writer, actor, National Artist for Film
 Claude Tayag, visual artist, restaurateur, and food writer
 Emmanuel Quintos Velasco, poet
 Lester Villarama, photographer 
 Alfred Yuson, author, novelist, poet

Organizations

Advocacy groups 
 Alternative Mobility (AltMobility)
 Life Cycles
 Move As One Coalition

Cooperatives 
 Alliance of Pavia, Iloilo Jeepney Operators and Drivers Association
 Banawa Transport Cooperative
 Bohol Island Operators and Drivers Multipurpose Cooperative
 Carmen Drivers and Conductors Multi-Purpose Cooperative
 Cebu Integrated Transport Service Multi-Purpose Cooperative (CITRASCO)
 Compostela Transport Cooperative
 First Community Credit Cooperative 
 Mandaue–Lapu-Lapu Transport Cooperative
 Mandaue Sabang Danao Multicab Drivers and Operators
 Pit-os Talamban Transport Cooperative
 United Sugbo Transport Cooperative
 Visayas United Drivers Transport Cooperative (VUDTRASCO)

Dioceses and religious groups 
 Clergy for the Moral Choice
 Council of Coordinators of the Ang Ligaya ng Panginoon Community
 Council of the Laity of the Roman Catholic Apostolic Vicariate of Calapan
 Council of the Laity of the Roman Catholic Apostolic Vicariate of Taytay
 Council of the Laity of the Roman Catholic Archdiocese of Lipa
 Council of the Laity of the Roman Catholic Archdiocese of Manila
 Council of the Laity of the Roman Catholic Diocese of Legazpi
 Couples for Christ International Council
 DaKaTeo Philippines
 Daughters of Charity of Saint Vincent de Paul in the Philippines
 De La Salle Brothers Philippine District
 Ecumenical Bishops Forum
 Kalookan Laity for Principled Politics
 Living Laudato' Si Philippines
 Order of Friars Minor (Franciscans) – Province of San Pedro Bautista
 Pari Madre Misyonero Para Kay Leni
 Roman Catholic Archdiocese of Cáceres
 Roman Catholic Archdiocese of Jaro
 Roman Catholic Diocese of Novaliches
 Sangguniang Laiko ng Diyosesis ng Romblon
 Sangguniang Laiko ng Pilipinas
 Tahanan ng Panginoon
 United Church of Christ in the Philippines
 United Imams of the Philippines – ZamBaSulTa Chapter (previously endorsed Isko Moreno)

Educational institutions 
 Adamson University
 Angelicum School Iloilo
 Ateneo de Manila University
 Ateneo de Naga University
 Central Philippine University
 De La Salle University
 Holy Angel University
 Saint Louis University
 San Beda University
 Universidad de Sta. Isabel, Robredo's alma mater
 University of Baguio
 University of the Cordilleras
 University of Santo Tomas

Sectoral groups 
 Agriculturists for Leni-Kiko
 Cordillera Peoples Alliance
 League of Organic Agriculture Municipalities, Cities and Provinces of the Philippines
 Pagkakaisa ng mga Samahan ng mga Tsuper at Opereytor Nationwide (Piston)

Trade unions 
 Federation of Free Workers
 Kapatiran sa Dalawang Gulong
 Kilusang Mayo Uno
 Nagkaisa! Labor Coalition
 National Confederation of Transportworkers Union
 National Congress of Unions in the Sugar Industry in the Philippines
 National Union of Bank Employees
 Sentro ng Nagkakaisa at Progresibong Manggagawa

See also 
 List of Bongbong Marcos 2022 presidential campaign endorsements

References

External links 
 Official website

2022 Philippine presidential campaigns
Philippines politics-related lists